Ballaghaderreen railway station  was a station which served Ballaghaderreen in County Roscommon, Ireland. It was the terminus of the branch line from Kilfree Junction.

History
It was opened by the Sligo & Ballaghaderreen Junction Railway in 1874 and operated by the MGWR.

The station included a goods shed, engine shed, turntable, sidings and cattle pens.
The unusual station building at Ballaghaderreen, of rough stone, remains though very derelict. Part of the platform also survives. The goods shed, used by the GAA, remains complete with its typical long cattle bank platform. Since closure the water tower and single road engine shed have been demolished, their site replaced by a health centre.  The terminus was unusual also for not having a signal cabin; the instruments were housed in the station building.

The station closed with the branch line in 1963.

References 

 

Midland Great Western Railway
Disused railway stations in County Roscommon
Railway stations opened in 1874
Railway stations closed in 1875
Railway stations opened in 1876
Railway stations closed in 1963